Thrinacodus is an extinct genus of basal elasmobranch, found worldwide from the Late Devonian-Lower Carboniferous. Most species are only known from their tricuspid teeth. T. gracia, originally placed in the separate genus Thrinacoselache from the Serpukhovian-aged Bear Gulch Limestone, of what is now Montana, is known from full body impressions, showing a long, slender eel-like body up to a metre in length, with an elongate rostrum. Stomach contents of T. gracia include remains of crustaceans and small chondrichthyan fish (Harpagofututor and Falcatus). It is a member of the Phoebodontiformes.

References

Carboniferous sharks

Fossil taxa described in 1875